Limni may refer to:

Lemnos (Limni in Turkish), a Greek island
Limni, Euboea, a village in Euboea, Greece